Gahlai is a village in Jaunpur, Uttar Pradesh, India. It is home of the famous temple Durgadevi which is situated on bank of River Basuhi. Every Tuesday thousands of people come there for prayer and to enjoy the fair. 

Nearby markets of the village are Sukhlaal Ganj, Tejgarh, Jamalapur and Mariahu. Nearest railway stations of the village are Bhanaur and Mariyahu. The average maximum temperature of the village is 45 °C and the minimum is 12 °C. The village's groundwater level is 25–30 feet

It is a producer of rice, wheat, mustard, sugar cane, bamboo, mahua, mango, blackberry, etc.

References

Villages in Jaunpur district